Players earn their tour membership either by winning tournaments, placing highly in the FedEx Cup rankings, promotion from the Web.com Tour, medical exemption, or via one time exemptions for reaching milestones.

For the 2019 season, 2016 Masters winner Danny Willett returned after concentrating on the European Tour in the previous season. Other notable joiners apart from Web.com Tour graduates include Joaquín Niemann and Kiradech Aphibarnrat. Among those to lose their full PGA Tour membership was 2010 U.S. Open champion Graeme McDowell, but he subsequently regained full membership on April 1, 2019 after winning the Corales Puntacana Resort and Club Championship.

List of members
Players below are listed by their current priority ranking for entry into PGA Tour tournaments, which can change several ways during the course of a season. Players highlighted in pink are competing on medical extensions, during which they must earn a specified number of FedEx Points or else risk losing their status in the middle of the season. A player who wins a tournament is elevated to category 9 or higher, depending on the tournament's prestige. Categories 25/26/27 and 29 are re-ordered five times throughout the season based on FedEx Cup points earned.

Full members

Reference:

Conditional members

Special temporary members, past champion members, and veteran members

The space below category 30 is occupied by special temporary members, past champion members, and veteran members. Players who have won at least one PGA Tour event are eligible for past champion membership, and players who have at least 150 made cuts on the PGA Tour are eligible for veteran membership. Any non-member who earns more FedEx Cup points than the 150th position in the 2018 FedEx Cup standings is eligible for special temporary membership. A special temporary member is still considered a non-member, but is eligible for unlimited sponsor exemptions.

Matt Fitzpatrick, Lucas Bjerregaard, and Doc Redman finished the season as special temporary members.

New full members 
Full members in the 2019 season who weren't full members in the 2018 season.

Reference:

Ex-full members 
Full members in the 2018 season who aren't full members in the 2019 season.

Many players who lose their full tour card meet the criteria for conditional membership, which means they rank behind full members in the priority ranking for PGA Tour tournament entry, but they may also enter via a sponsors exemption.

Reference:

References

2019 PGA Tour card holders